Devdaraki is a valley glacier located on the northeastern slope of Mt. Kazbek. Devdaraki is known for its intense surging properties that have caused significant destruction in the past (particularly from the late 18th to the late 19th centuries). The glacier surges have led to catastrophic mudflows in the Dariali Gorge which have, on several occasions damaged the Georgian Military Highway. A massive collapse of the glacier on August 20, 2014, led to the death of seven people. The Devdaraki Glacier is the source of the River Kabakhi (left tributary of the Terek River).

See also
Glaciers of Georgia

References 

 Georgian State (Soviet) Encyclopedia. 1975. Book 3. p. 434.

Glaciers of Georgia (country)